Miss Italia is a beauty pageant awarding prizes every year to young, female contestants from Italy. Since the first edition of the contest in 1939 many of the contestants have gone on to notable careers in television and film.

History
The forerunner of Miss Italia was Miss Sorriso (Miss Smile) started in 1939 by Dino Villani, and sponsored by a brand of toothpaste. Contestants were judged by their photographs rather than competing on a runway.

After a break during World War II, the contest resumed in 1946 and adopted the present-day name of Miss Italia. It was held in Stresa, which had managed to maintain its hotel infrastructure despite the war. The venue then changed several times before it was established that Salsomaggiore Terme would be the permanent, annual host to the pageant.

Like contemporary Italian society itself, Miss Italia has gone through many changes over the years. In 1950 it was first broadcast on the radio. But since 1987 it has been broadcast live on television. As of 1990 the chest, waist, and hip measurements of the contestants are no longer judged, and in 1994 the contest was opened to married women and mothers. (The 1987 winner had been disqualified when it was later discovered she was married.) In 1996, Denny Mendez became the first Miss Italia woman of colour.

Among the participants finding later success in cinema and the entertainment industry at large (although many not having actually won the crown of Miss Italia itself) include: Silvana Pampanini, Sophia Loren, Marcella Mariani, Lucia Bosè, Stefania Sandrelli, Mirca Viola, Simona Ventura, Patrizia Deitos, Anna Falchi and Martina Colombari.

Since 1959 the organizer of Miss Italia has been Enzo Mirigliani, to whose work the contest owes much of its current success. The jury groups that elect Miss Italia have included celebrities such as Totò, Giorgio de Chirico, Giovannino Guareschi, Luchino Visconti, Vittorio De Sica, Gina Lollobrigida, Alberto Lattuada, Marcello Mastroianni, Ugo Tognazzi, Lina Wertmüller, Dino Risi, Alberto Sordi, and Claudia Cardinale.

Besides the title of "Miss Italia", during the pageant other consolation prizes are also awarded, including "Miss Elegance" and "Miss Cinema".  In 1991 a separate pageant was instituted, called "Miss Italia Nel Mondo", a competition for Italian women living abroad.

Miss Italia will no longer be held in Salsomaggiore Terme, for economic reasons.  This was announced in April 2011 and a long list of cities have expressed interest in hosting the pageant. Cities include Sanremo, Rome, Fiuggi, Taormina and many more. It was officially announced that Miss Italia 2011 will be held in Montecatini Terme. Milly Carlucci will not return as host of the pageant. Fabrizio Frizzi has replaced her for Miss Italia 2011. The pageant will only take place over two nights, rather than three. This year the beauty pageant contest, back in a national broadcast television. The contest will be produced by Infront and rai, The host will be Alessandro Greco. A program by Casimiro Lieto, Luca Parenti and Alessandro Migliaccio. Directed by Francesco Ebner

Regional rankings

The Winners of Miss Italia

Hosts
Corrado Mantoni: 1946–56
Nunzio Filogamo: 1952
Enzo Mirigliani: 1959, 1961–78
Renato Tagliani: 1960
Mike Bongiorno: 1970, 1975, 2007
Daniele Piombi: 1974
Gabriella Farinon: 1974
Pippo Baudo: 1976
Alberto Lupo: 1977
Vanna Brosio: 1979
Andrea Giordana: 1980–1981, 1984, 1987
Memo Remigi: 1982
Ettore Andenna: 1983
Michele Gammino: 1983
Milly Carlucci: 1983, 2009, 2010
Marco Columbro: 1986
Fabrizio Frizzi: 1988–2002, 2011, 2012
Carlo Conti: 2003–06, 2008
Loretta Goggi: 2007
Emanuele Filiberto of Savoy, Prince of Venice: 2010
Massimo Ghini: 2013
Cesare Bocci: 2013
Francesca Chillemi: 2013
Simona Ventura: 2014–2015
Francesco Facchinetti: 2016–18
Diletta Leotta: 2018
Alessandro Greco: 2019-2020
Alessandro Di Sarno: 2021
Elettra Lamborghini: 2021
Carolina Stramare: 20211
Salvo Sottile: 2022

See also
Miss Universo Italia
Miss Italia nel Mondo
Miss World Italy

Notes

External links

Italy
Beauty pageants in Italy
Recurring events established in 1939
Italian awards